Chi Tau was a small national men's fraternity founded on October 3, 1920 at Trinity College, the predecessor to Duke University. The majority of its 9 chapters were in North Carolina. It disbanded at the start of the Great Depression, with members and chapters dispersing by 1929. At least two chapters lingered as independent organizations for several years.

History
Chi Tau was founded at North Carolina's Trinity College, now known as Duke University on October 3, 1920. The group honored four Founders:
 Henry Belk
 Merrimon Teague Hipps
 Samuel L. Holton, Jr.
 Numa Francis Wilkerson

The group existed as a local for almost three years, until May 2, 1923 when a joint meeting was called in the city of Durham, North Carolina between Chi Tau and another local society, Lambda Sigma Delta, then existing at North Carolina State College. The two groups established themselves as a new national fraternity under the name Chi Tau, then incorporating under the laws of the state of North Carolina. For several years the fraternity published a quarterly journal called the "Ex Tee". One reference notes another publication called The Hexagon. It used as a motto the same words as the state of North Carolina, Esse Quam Videri.

Chi Tau's badge was a hexagon, taller from top to bottom, with the Greek letters Χ and Τ. For symbols it carried a torch, a single triangle, and three stars. The fraternity's colors were white, crimson and gold.  Its flowers were white, red and yellow rose buds.

Chapters
Baird's Manual lists an eventual nine chapters without chartering dates, though that reference doesn't rule out that there could have been more. Dates for disbanding are from collegiate yearbooks. Known withdrawals are listed; there may have been more:

Demise
According to Baird's, Chi Tau reported that internal dissension developed, and by 1929 the fraternity disintegrated without a national successor. But this oblique statement may not have captured the situation fully. In an article published marking the initiation of the former Chi Tau chapter at Wake Forest, the May 1940 Sigma Phi Epsilon journal notes that, "In 1924, the Alpha chapter disbanded. In quick succession the other chapters followed suit until only two chapters were left--one here at Wake Forest and the other at the University of Illinois.  Both lodges [~chapters] decided to go their own way as locals and to drop any idea of a revival of the national organization." Writing about the period of disintegration after 1925, the authors appear unaware of the decision by apparently healthy Epsilon chapter at Presbyterian College to similarly seek a move to align with another national fraternity, Beta Kappa in 1930.  Additionally, contradicting the statement from Wake Forest, rather than meeting its demise in 1924 Alpha chapter continued its presence - according to Duke's yearbook, The Chanticleer - through 1928. In the 1929 edition it was abruptly gone.

Once disbanded, the Iota chapter at the University of Illinois continued as a local chapter for three years. In 1933 it opted to merge into Phi Sigma Kappa's Alpha Deuteron chapter on that campus, expanding on friendships that had developed between the members. Another chapter, Delta at Wake Forest, continued into 1939 when it became a chapter of Sigma Phi Epsilon.

Note: A separate local fraternity with this name was established at Chico State University in 1939. This was ten years after the demise of the original Chi Tau national. Any name similarity to the North Carolina-established group is mere coincidence.

Notes

References

Defunct fraternities and sororities
Student organizations established in 1920
1920 establishments in North Carolina